The Dexter Arnold Farmstead is a historic farmstead on Chopmist Hill Road (Rhode Island Route 102) in Scituate, Rhode Island.  The main house, a -story wood-frame structure five bays wide, with a large central chimney, was built in 1813.  The  property also has five outbuildings which appear (based in part on photographs of the property from 1860) to be near contemporaries to the house, a relative rarity in rural Rhode Island.  The main barn survived into the 20th century, but was destroyed by the New England Hurricane of 1938.  The property also includes a small family cemetery.  The house, built by Dexter Arnold in land belonging to his father, remained in family hands until 1975.

The farmhouse was listed on the National Register of Historic Places in 1977.

See also
National Register of Historic Places listings in Providence County, Rhode Island

References

Houses on the National Register of Historic Places in Rhode Island
Federal architecture in Rhode Island
Houses in Providence County, Rhode Island
Buildings and structures in Scituate, Rhode Island
National Register of Historic Places in Providence County, Rhode Island
Houses completed in 1813